India Song is a 1975 French drama film directed by Marguerite Duras. India Song stars Delphine Seyrig, Michael Lonsdale, Mathieu Carrière, Claude Mann, Vernon Dobtcheff and Didier Flamand. The film centres on Anne-Marie (Seyrig), the promiscuous wife of the French ambassador in India, and was based on an unproduced play written by Duras (which itself was based on her published novel Le Vice-Consul). Although set in India, the film was shot mostly on location at the Château Rothschild.

A sequel with the title Son nom de Venise dans Calcutta désert was released in 1976.

Plot
Anne-Marie Stretter (Delphine Seyrig) is the wife of the French ambassador in India in the 1930s. With the full knowledge of the French ambassador, Anne-Marie has many affairs while the world they inhabit decays from the inside out. The Vice-Consul of Lahore (Michael Lonsdale) discusses a love affair with her, one that is impossible due to an earlier scandal where he fired on lepers, mirrors and himself. Anne-Marie finally succeeds in the suicide they'd initially attempted many years before.

Production

The script for India Song was based on an unproduced play which Marguerite Duras finished in July 1972. The play had been commissioned for the Royal National Theatre by Peter Hall. Duras had only visited India briefly in her teens, but chose to not consult any photographs from Calcutta while she worked on India Song, preferring to imagine it all.

The film cost 254,542 francs to produce, of which 250,000 came from the CNC. Dominique Sanda was the first choice for the leading role, but dropped out and was replaced by Seyrig. Finding the main location took several months; eventually Duras chose the Château Rothschild in Boulogne, which she had seen during a walk and which had impressed her. The Rothschild family had abandoned the building after World War II and it had started to dilapidate. Other scenes were shot at the Grand Trianon in Versailles, and in two Paris apartments which were about to be demolished. Filming started May 13, 1974 and lasted two months. The voices were pre-recorded.

Release
India Song was shown as part of the 1975 New York Film Festival, and, out of competition, at the 1975 Cannes Film Festival. It was released in France on June 4, 1975.

Reception
Vincent Canby, writing for The New York Times, reviewed the film in a negative light, finding that it was aesthetically pleasing but shallow. Canby described India Song as "no content and all style", although he felt that Seyrig's portrayal of Anne-Marie was "marvelous to contemplate". Clarke Fountain, reviewing the film for Allrovi, rated it four out of five stars.

India Song was nominated for three César Awards in 1976—Best Music Written for a Film for Carlos d'Alessio, Best Sound for Michel Vionnet, and Best Actress for Delphine Seyrig. However, the film did not win in any of the nominated categories. It was France's submission for Best Foreign Language Film at the 48th Academy Awards, but did not receive a nomination.

Today the film is seen more favourably by critics and it is included in the book 1001 Movies You Must See Before You Die, where Travis Crawford cites it as the director's best film, describing the film as "fascinating" in its use of language and sound in contrast to imagery, and calling it an "elliptical dream poem rather than linear narrative". However, he acknowledges that opinions are markedly divided on the film and that viewers will either find it "hypnotically seductive or maddeningly pretentious". Michael Lonsdale considered his part to be his "most favorite role", adding that "it helped me exorcise the suffering I was going through at the time in my personal life".

See also
 1975 in film
 Cinema of France
 List of French submissions for the Academy Award for Best Foreign Language Film
 List of submissions to the 48th Academy Awards for Best Foreign Language Film

References
Notes

Bibliography

External links
 

1975 drama films
1975 films
Films directed by Marguerite Duras
Films set in India
Films set in the British Raj
Films set in Kolkata
Films set in the 1930s
French drama films
1970s French-language films
Adultery in films
1970s French films